Marie-Odile Bouillé (born 13 October 1950 in Nantes) was a member of the National Assembly of France.   She represented Loire-Atlantique's 8th constituency from 2007 to 2017 as a member of the Socialiste, radical, citoyen et divers gauche.

References

1950 births
Living people
Politicians from Nantes
Socialist Party (France) politicians
Women members of the National Assembly (France)
Deputies of the 13th National Assembly of the French Fifth Republic
Deputies of the 14th National Assembly of the French Fifth Republic
21st-century French women politicians
French midwives